Sardar Joginder Singh Bhachu (9 February 1932 – 24 October 2013) was a successful endurance rally driver in the 1960s and 1970s. Popularly known as "The Flying Sikh", He won the Safari Rally three times, in 1965 driving a Volvo PV544 with his brother Jaswant as co-driver, and in 1974 and 1976 driving a Mitsubishi Colt Lancer 1600 GSR.

Career
The eldest of ten children born to Sardar Battan Singh and Sardarni Swaran Kaur, first generation Kenyan Asian migrants from the Punjab region of India, he was educated at a boarding school in Nairobi. His first work experience was as a spanner boy in his father's garage, and he gained further experience as a mechanic in other organisations before becoming the Royal East African Automobile Association's first patrolman in 1958.

The first Sikh driver ever to win an international rally, and also the first man to win the Safari Rally three times, he was fondly known as the "Flying Sikh" for his exploits behind the wheel. Although Ugandan rival Shekhar Mehta has more outright victories in the event, Singh's record of 19 finishes in 22 attempts is an unprecedented feat of consistency in what has been long regarded as the world's toughest rally, where the attrition rate can exceed 90%. He was even one of the so-called "Unsinkable Seven" – the only crews in the 1968 event who were able to reach the finish at Nairobi when the rest of the entire field of 74 were stranded on the Mau Escarpment along the western rim of the Great Rift Valley.

He had no motorsport experience until he was 26, but made up for his late start by eventually accumulating over sixty wins in the East African Rally Championships in Kenya, Uganda and Tanzania. Aside from his three wins on the Safari Rally, he also scored three top five finishes in the Southern Cross Rally in Australia in the 1970s, and was twice awarded Kenya's Motor Sportsman of the Year title (1970, 1976).

His historic first Safari win in 1965 proved to be a triumph against expectations and a defiance of superstition. It was the 13th running of the event, and his car was given the number 1 which was at that time considered an unlucky number in the Safari. Nevertheless, there was only good fortune for Joginder and Jaswant, despite piloting the same Volvo which factory driver Tom Trana had used in the 1964 Safari and which had clocked up 42,000 competitive miles on its odometer before the Bhachu brothers' victory.

He spent many years as a resident in the United Kingdom from the 1980s and lived in Canada. He was present as a guest at the opening of the 50th running of the Safari Rally in 2002, and was appointed patron of the Safari Classic for 2007.

Joginder Singh died of heart failure in London on Sunday 20 October 2013, he was aged 81.

Flying Sikh
Singh was called the Flying Sikh in a book by Roger Barnard, Peter Moll, which was illustrated by Mohamed Amin. Published by TransAfrica Publishers in 1975, this 109-page book gives an account of his early life. An article in the Daily Nation quotes the book describing Singh's father as his inspiration.

WRC victories

References

External links

Joginder Singh
Obituary

1932 births
2013 deaths
World Rally Championship people
Kenyan rally drivers
World Rally Championship drivers
Kenyan people of Indian descent
Kenyan Sikhs
Kenyan people of Punjabi descent